Queen Victoria (1819–1901) was Queen of the United Kingdom of Great Britain and Ireland from 1837 to 1901 and Empress of India from 1876 to 1901.

Queen Victoria may also refer to:

People
 Victoria, Princess Royal (1840–1901), her daughter, Queen consort of Prussia in 1888, also known as Empress Frederick
 Victoria of Baden (1862–1930), Queen consort of Sweden from 1907 to 1930
 Victoria Eugenie of Battenberg (1887–1969), Queen consort of Spain from 1906 to 1931

Other uses
 Queen Victoria, a 1843 painting by Franz Xaver Winterhalter
 Queen Victoria (ship), several ships named after Queen Victoria
 Queen Victoria (grape), another name for the wine grape Chasselas
 The Queen Victoria, a pub in the television show EastEnders
 Trollinger or Queen Victoria, a German/Italian wine grape

See also

 Victoria, Crown Princess of Sweden (born 1977), possible future regnal name
 New Adventures of Queen Victoria, webcomic which stars Queen Victoria and her family.
 List of places named after Queen Victoria
 List of statues of Queen Victoria
 Princess Victoria (disambiguation)
 Victoria (UK TV series), an ITV drama by Daisy Goodwin
 
 Victoria Regina (disambiguation)